Kyode (Gikyode, Chode) is a Guang language of Ghana.

References

Guang languages
Languages of Ghana
Kyode people